The Nadia Reisenberg Memorial Recital Award is a biennial piano competition held at Mannes College of Music in New York City since 2004.

The competition was established by the Nadia Reisenberg & Clara Rockmore Foundation to honor the memory of Lithuanian-born pianist Nadia Reisenberg who lived in New York City and taught at Mannes.

Candidates are nominated by a panel of judges, and the winner of the competition performs a solo recital at one of the main concert venues in New York City, such as Carnegie Hall or Merkin Concert Hall.

Winners
 2004: Ying Feng
 2006: Dudana Mazmanishvili / Ilya Kazantsev
 2008: Sam Armstrong
 2010: Vlada Vassilieva
 2012: Reed Tetzloff
 2014: Yekwon Sunwoo / Magdalena Mullerperth

References

External links
 The Nadia Reisenberg & Clara Rockmore Foundation

Piano competitions in the United States
2004 establishments in New York City
Recurring events established in 2004